Roman Yevgenyevich Parfinovich (born 14 March 1994) is a Russian football midfielder.

Club career
He made his debut in the Russian Second Division for  FC Sibir-2 Novosibirsk on 29 April 2012 in a game against FC Mostovik-Primorye Ussuriysk.

He made his Russian Football National League debut for FC Sibir Novosibirsk on 14 August 2017 in a game against FC Luch-Energiya Vladivostok.

References

External links
 
 
 

1994 births
Sportspeople from Novosibirsk
Living people
Russian footballers
Association football midfielders
FC Sibir Novosibirsk players